Rochefort (M945) is the eleventh ship in the City / Vlissingen-class mine countermeasures vessels, and sixth to be built for the Belgian Navy.

References

Mine warfare vessel classes
Minehunters of Belgium